Maya is a 2010 novel by Alastair Campbell, the former communications director to Tony Blair.  It is Campbell's second novel and third book, after The Blair Years and All in the Mind.  Maya drew generally favorable reviews and some claimed that it was, in part based on his relationship with Blair, however Campbell has denied this.

External links
 Telegraph review
 Times review

2010 British novels
Novels by Alastair Campbell
Hutchinson (publisher) books